USS Conestoga was originally a civilian side-wheel towboat built at Brownsville, Pennsylvania, in 1859. She was acquired by the U.S. Army in June 1861 and converted to a 572-ton "timberclad" river gunboat for use by the Western Gunboat Flotilla, with officers provided by the navy.

Civil War service
Conestoga's first combat action took place in September 1861 when she engaged CSS Jackson near Lucas Bend, Kentucky. Other skirmishes punctuated the routine of river patrol service into 1862. In February, she participated in an expedition up the Tennessee River that led to the capture of Forts Henry and Donelson. Later in the month, she saw action at Columbus, Kentucky, a Confederate strongpoint on the Mississippi River.

During the rest of her service, Conestoga continued to operate along the rivers. She took part in the bombardment of Saint Charles, Arkansas, in June 1862 and was formally transferred to the navy in October of that year. In April and July 1863, she was involved in expeditions to Palmyra, Tennessee, and up the Red River, Louisiana. The following March, she went up Louisiana's Black and Ouachita Rivers. Soon after, on 8 March 1864, USS Conestoga was sunk in a collision with USS General Price.

References

External links

 USS Conestoga (1861-1864) images

 

1859 ships
Ships built in Brownsville, Pennsylvania
Ships of the Union Navy
Steamships of the United States Navy
Ships sunk in collisions
Shipwrecks of the American Civil War
Shipwrecks of the Mississippi River
Maritime incidents in March 1864